James G. Clark may refer to:
 James G. Clark (Medal of Honor), American Civil War soldier and Medal of Honor recipient
 Jim Clark (sheriff) (James Gardner Clark Jr.), sheriff of Dallas County, Alabama, United States
 Jimmy Clark (boxer) (James G. Clark), American boxer

See also
 James Clark (disambiguation)